Pennsylvania Route 523 (PA 523) is a  state highway located in Somerset County, Pennsylvania.  The southern terminus is at U.S. Route 40 (US 40) in Addison.  The northern terminus is at PA 281 in Confluence.

Route description

PA 523 begins at an intersection with US 40 east of the borough of Addison in Addison Township, heading northeast on two-lane undivided Listonburg Road. The road passes a mix of woods and farms, curving north into forested areas and heading through Listonburg. The route winds through more woodland with occasional farms, running through Beachly and Dumas. Farther north, PA 523 crosses the Casselman River into Lower Turkeyfoot Township and curves west at Harnedsville. The road passes more farmland and woodland, running a short distance to the south of CSX's Keystone Subdivision railroad line and north of the Casselman River. The route continues into the borough of Confluence, where the road, river, and railroad all bend to the north. The road becomes Oden Street and passes homes and business, reaching an intersection with PA 281. At this point, PA 281 turns north to form a concurrency with the route, passing more residences. PA 523 ends at the point where PA 281 turns to the east onto Logan Place.

Major intersections

See also

References

External links

Pennsylvania Highways: PA 523

523
Transportation in Somerset County, Pennsylvania